Daai (Daai Chin), which borders the Mün and Ütbü language groups, is a Kuki-Chin-Mizo language of Burma. It is spoken in 142 villages in Kanpetlet, Matupi, Mindat, and Paletwa townships in Chin State, Burma (Ethnologue).

Dialects
Ethnologue lists the following dialects of Daai Chin.

Ngxang
Nghngilo (Yang)
Ma-Tu
Shiip
Duk-Msang 
Kheng
Mkuui

Phonology

Consonants
Daai has twenty-four consonant phonemes.

Vowels
Daai has seven vowel phonemes, each with a phonemic length contrast.

Grammar
Daai is an isolating or analytic language. There is no inflectional morphology at the word level; case, number, and tense are marked by clitics.

Examples

References

Naing Kheng. 2017. A phonological description of the Mkuui variety of Dai Chin. Master's Thesis.
Helga So-Hartmann. 2009. A Descriptive Grammar of Daai Chin. The Regents University of California.

Kuki-Chin languages
Languages of Myanmar